Duxford Chapel is a chapel that was once part of the Hospital of St. John, founded by William de Colville (d.1230) at Duxford, in Cambridgeshire, England. Though called Duxford Chapel, the building is situated between the villages of Duxford and Whittlesford, adjacent to Whittlesford Parkway railway station.

Built in the 14th century, only the chapel survives today. It is a Grade II* listed building  and scheduled ancient monument.

The Chapel of the Hospital of St John the Baptist is a small rectangular chapel which mostly dates to around 1337 and was built using flint rubble for the walls and limestone for the doorways and windows. Some sections of the building, including a small part of the southern wall, are considered to date from its 13th century predecessor, which formed part of a hospital.

The chapel is a single storey building. The main entrance is near the western end of the north wall. There are two similar doors in the south wall, one directly opposite the main entrance, the other (a priest's door) located towards the eastern end. The north wall is pierced by four windows, dated to circa 1330–1360, each containing a single light with tracery of trefoil design. The four windows on the southern side are of similar date and design, although each formerly contained two lights divided by a central mullion.

Of these windows in the southern wall, the one nearest the altar (East) is flanked by a piscina and a sedilia. Facing the sedilia on the North side is a niche which is thought to be the location of the Easter Sepulchre. A plain aumbry sits in the East wall.

In 1548 the chapel was suppressed during the dissolution of chantries in the reign of Edward VI and sometime after 1554 the chapel was used as a barn by the proprietors of the 16th century Red Lion Inn next door.

The chapel was acquired and restored by the Ministry of Works between 1947 and 1954 and is now under the guardianship of English Heritage.

References

External links

 History of Duxford Chapel: English Heritage
Duxford Chapel at the Cambridgeshire Churches website

Buildings and structures completed in 1337
14th-century church buildings in England
Churches in Cambridgeshire
English Heritage sites in Cambridgeshire
Grade II* listed buildings in Cambridgeshire
Scheduled monuments in Cambridgeshire
Grade II* listed churches in Cambridgeshire